The 2006–07 UEFA Futsal Cup was the 21st edition of Europe's premier club futsal tournament and the 6th edition under the current UEFA Futsal Cup format.

Preliminary round

Main round

Elite Round

Group A

 Verona, 7–10 December 2006

Group B

 Moscow, 4–7 December 2006

Group C

 Chorzów, 5–8 December 2006

Group D

 Budapest, 7–10 December 2006

Final four
The following teams have qualified for the Final Four round:
 ElPozo Murcia FS
 Boomerang Interviú
 MFK Dinamo Moskva
 Action 21 Charleroi

Semifinals

Final 3rd and 4th

Final

External links
 Official UEFA Futsal Cup website

UEFA Futsal Champions League
Cup